Dannie N. Heineman (23 November 1872 – 31 January 1962) was a Belgian-American engineer and businessman. He was the managing director and controlling shareholder of the Belgian industrial multinational Sofina. He was a prolific sponsor of science especially through Heineman Foundation in medical sciences and awards in mathematical physics and astrophysics.

In 1939, while living in Belgium, Dannie Heineman managed to get the Luxembourg government to open its closed borders and admit approximately 100 Jewish families from Germany. The persuasive argument was that hotels in Luxembourg were empty and he would pay for the rooms and give the Jews an allowance, and they would not be working and taking jobs away from Luxembourg workers. This arrangement worked until 10 May 1940 when Hitler invaded. At that point his assistant Mr. Schmidt made a final six months payment to the families. Among the families was the physicist Ernst Ising who survived the war.

See also
Dannie Heineman Prize of the Göttingen Academy of Sciences and Humanities
Dannie Heineman Prize for Mathematical Physics
Dannie Heineman Prize for Astrophysics

References

External links

 Biography at American Physical Society
 Website of the Heineman Stiftung, German Foundation
 Website of the Heineman Foundation, American Foundation
 Website of the Heineman-Robicsek Foundation

1872 births
1962 deaths